Girl was the name of two weekly comics magazines for girls published by IPC Magazines in the United Kingdom.

The first and more well-known volume was published from 1951 to 1964. It was launched by Hulton Press on 2 November 1951 as a sister paper to the Eagle, and lasted through Hultons' acquisition by Odhams Press in 1959 and Odhams' merger into IPC in 1963. Its final issue was dated 3 October 1964, after which it was merged into Princess. Girl was very much an educational magazine whose heroines, including those who got into scrapes, became involved in tales that had a moral substance. A considerable number of pages were also dedicated to real-life tales of heroic women in various fields.

A second volume of the series was published by IPC from 1981 to 1990, during which time Dreamer and Tammy were merged into it.

Original series
Like the Eagle, Girl was founded by the Rev. Marcus Morris, with the close participation of Morris' fellow clergyman Chad Varah. The lead strip was originally Kitty Hawke and her All-Girl Air Crew, drawn in full colour by Ray Bailey, about a group of women running a charter airline. The strip was not very popular — it was apparently felt to be too masculine — and it was moved to the black-and-white interior pages, replaced on the cover by the schoolgirl strip Wendy and Jinx, written by Michael and Valerie Hastings and drawn by Bailey.

Other strips included:

Angela Air Hostess, written by Betty Roland and drawn by Dudley Pout (1958-1961)
At Work With Janet — Fashion Artist, drawn by Marjorie Slade
Belle of the Ballet by George Beardmore and Stanley Houghton
Captain Starling by George Beardmore and Paddy Nevin
Claudia of the Circus, written by Geoffrey Bond and drawn by T. S. La Fontaine
A Cosy Christmas, drawn by Gerald Haylock
Emergency Ward 10, based on the TV series, drawn by Eric Dadswell
Flying Cloud, a western strip, written by Charles Chilton
Judy and Pat, illustrated by Harry Winslade
Laura and the Legend of Hadley House by Betty Roland and Dudley Pout (1954)
Lettice Leefe — the greenest girl in the school, by John Ryan
Lindy Love by Ruth Adam and Peter Kay (1954–55)
Pat of Paradise Isle by Betty Roland and Dudley Pout (1953-1954)
Penny Starr, written by Peter Ling and Sheilah Ward (1957)
 Penny Wise by Norman Pett
 The Pilgrim Sisters by George Beardmore and Hardee
Prince of the Pampas, drawn by Dudley Pout (1961)
The Rajah's Secret by Betty Roland and Charles Paine
Robbie of Red Hall, drawn by Roy Newby
Sally of the South Seas by J. H. G. Freeman and Dudley Pout (1961)
Sumuna's South Sea Isle by Terry Standford and Paddy Nevin
Susan of St. Bride's, series about a student nurse, by Ruth Adam and Peter Kay (1954–61)<ref>Shu-fen Tsai,  Girlhood Modified in Susan of St. Brides in Girl magazine (1954-1961) (pdf), Dong Hwa Journal of Humanistic Studies 2, July 2000, pp. 259-272</ref>
 Susan Marsh by Ruth Adam and Peter KayTessa of TelevisionThree Sisters of Haworth, bio of the Brontë sisters, written by Pamela Green and Kenneth Gravett, drawn by Eric DadswellTravel Girl by Molly Black and Dudley Pout (1952-52)Two Pairs of Skates, written by Peter Ling and Sheilah Ward (1956–57)The Untold Arabian Nights by Geoffrey Bond and Cecil Langley DoughtyVicky by Betty Roland and Dudley Pout (1954-1958) — reprinted as Vicky in Australia in Princess TinaWhite Queen of Calabar, drawn by Gerald HaylockYvette by Sylvia Little and Dudley Pout (1952)
 Your Pets by Barbara Woodhouse and George Howe

1980s series

It "had photo-stories, boyfriends, pop stars and problem pages, alongside its occasional illustrated story."

The IPC title Dreamer, which debuted on September 19, 1981, merged into Girl after Dreamer's May 15, 1982, issue. The merged publication carried the title Girl and Dreamer in the period 1982–1983 (issues 89 to 110 at least).

The fellow IPC title Tammy (launched 1971) was intended to merge with Girl in the summer of 1984, but, according to the Grand Comics Database, "a printer's dispute in June 1984 prevented the final issues being published and it was simply canceled. Girl did carry the Tammy masthead for several issues from 25th August 1984 but these issues contain no material from Tammy."

In March 1990, Girl was merged into its fellow IPC title My Guy, which became My Guy and Girl for a period. Girl volume 2 published 478 issues.

 Strips 
 Diary of a Ballerina The Haunting of Uncle Gideon Patty's World by Purita Campos — continued from Princess Tina and Pink''

References

Sources 
 
 

British girls' comics
Defunct British comics
Comics magazines published in the United Kingdom
1951 comics debuts
1964 comics endings
Magazines established in 1951
Magazines disestablished in 1964
1981 comics debuts
1990 comics endings
Magazines established in 1981
Magazines disestablished in 1990
Comics about women
Odhams Press titles